Niousha Noor (Persian:نيوشا نور born: Niousha Jafarian) is a Los Angeles-based Iranian American actress. Her father is cinematographer Hossein Jafarian.

Noor has appeared in numerous TV shows and films, including playing Donya on HBO's Here and Now. In 2020, Noor starred opposite Shahab Hosseini in IFC's psychological thriller The Night, which made history as the first U.S.-produced film to receive a license for a theatrical release in Iran since the 1979 revolution. Her performance as Neda garnered her widespread critical acclaim.

In September 2021, Noor was announced as a principal cast member of the Netflix series Kaleidoscope, as an FBI agent investigating a heist by a team led by Giancarlo Esposito's character. Shortly after production of Kaleidoscope, Noor was cast as one of the lead characters in Maryam Keshavarz's The Persian Version, which had its world premiere at the Sundance Film Festival in 2023, competing in the U.S. Dramatic category.

References

External links 
 

Year of birth missing (living people)
Living people
Place of birth missing (living people)
American people of Iranian descent
Actresses from Los Angeles